This article lists the results and fixtures for the Mauritius women's national football team.

Record per opponent
Key

The following table shows Mauritius' all-time official international record per opponent:

Results

2011

2012

2014

2015

2016

2017

2018

2019

2022

See also
 Mauritius national football team results

References

External links
 Mauritius results on The Roon Ba
 Mauritius results on Global Sports Archive

Results
2010s in Mauritius
2020s in Mauritius
Mauritius
results women's